Brownsville, Ontario can mean the following places:
Brownsville, Durham Regional Municipality, Ontario
Brownsville, Oxford County, Ontario

Brownsville may also refer to:
the original name of Schomberg, Ontario
an early settlement of Woodbridge, Ontario, founded between 1802 and 1837, now subsumed by Woodbridge

See also
Brownsville Station, Ontario